Ronald McKinnon (born 20 August 1940) is a Scottish former professional footballer, who played for Rangers and the Scotland national team.

Career

Rangers
McKinnon, a central defender (who had been a winger in his youth during early spells at Junior level), made his Rangers debut against Hearts on 8 March 1961 in a 3–0 win at Ibrox. He went on to make 487 appearances for the club in all competitions between 1961 and 1971, winning two Scottish League championships, four Scottish Cups and three League Cups.

His final Rangers appearance was in the 1971–72 European Cup Winners' Cup second round match against Sporting CP in Lisbon, where he suffered a broken leg. Rangers went on to win the Cup Winners' Cup that season but McKinnon, who had been a regular for a decade but was already in the latter stages of his career, was put out of action entirely for a year due to the complications of the injury and the poor manner in which it was treated.

International
McKinnon won a total of 28 caps for Scotland, making his debut in a 1–0 win over Italy at Hampden Park in 1965, in which Rangers teammate John Greig had scored a memorable late winner. He also played in the 3–2 win over England at Wembley in 1967. His only goal for Scotland came in a 3–2 win over Wales, also in 1967. He also represented the Scottish League XI.

Later and personal life
After leaving Rangers in 1973, McKinnon moved to South Africa, where he played local football for a season. He later returned to Scotland and settled on the Isle of Lewis where his mother was born and where he had spent time as a child during World War II.

His connection to Rangers continues to this day as he is an Honorary Member & Ambassador of The Lewis & Harris Rangers Supporters Club, and still travels to matches at Ibrox with the island fans at least once a season.

McKinnon's twin brother Donnie was also a professional footballer, spending 14 seasons with Partick Thistle as a centre-half. He was also one of the coaches for the Scotland national team for many years.

Honours
Rangers
Scottish League First Division: 1962–63, 1963–64
Scottish Cup: 1961–62, 1962–63, 1963–64, 1965–66
Scottish League Cup: 1963–64, 1964–65, 1970–71 
European Cup Winners' Cup: Runner-up 1966–67

Scotland
British Home Championship: 1966–67

References

External links

Ronnie McKinnon - Rangers Hall of Fame

Living people
1940 births
Footballers from Glasgow
People from Govan
People educated at Govan High School
People associated with Scottish islands
Scottish footballers
Scotland international footballers
Dunipace F.C. players
Scottish Junior Football Association players
Rangers F.C. players
Scottish Football League players
Association football central defenders
Scottish expatriate footballers
Scottish expatriate sportspeople in South Africa
Expatriate soccer players in South Africa
Scottish Football League representative players
Scottish twins
Twin sportspeople
Scotland under-23 international footballers